Marciel Silva da Silva (born 8 March 1995) is a Brazilian footballer who last played as midfielder for Remo.

Career

Early life
Marciel began playing for Grêmio's academy at the age of ten. He was part of the team until 2012, when he was released. He joined a youth project team called Fragata, owned by former Brazil national football team player Emerson. He eventually draw attention of Juventus, but signed a loan deal on the same year with Roma's academy. The loan ended in 2013 as Marciel didn't have an EU passport, therefore being unable to continue. In April 2014, Marciel signed a loan deal with Corinthians' academy and had a very successful campaign. He won the 2014 U20 Campeonato Paulista, 2014 U20 Campeonato Brasileiro and the 2015 Copa São Paulo de Futebol Júnior, including being chosen as the best player of the latter tournament.

Corinthians
Marciel was bought by R$1,000,000 and promoted to Corinthians main squad in February 2015, right after the end of Copa São Paulo de Futebol Júnior.

Marciel made his professional debut on 27 June 2015, as he entered in the second half of Corinthians' 2–1 victory against Figueirense at Arena Corinthians. He made his first league start in a home win against Fluminense on September 2. He also scored his first goal for Corinthians, as he netted the first goal of a 2–0 victory.

Statistics

Honours
Corinthians
Campeonato Brasileiro Série A: 2015, 2017
Campeonato Paulista: 2017

Remo
Campeonato Paraense: 2022

References

1995 births
Living people
Brazilian footballers
Association football midfielders
Campeonato Brasileiro Série A players
Sport Club Corinthians Paulista players
Cruzeiro Esporte Clube players
Associação Atlética Ponte Preta players
Esporte Clube Juventude players
Clube Náutico Capibaribe players
Clube do Remo players
Footballers from Porto Alegre